William Gillespie Wyly (February, 1831 – September 25, 1903) was a justice of the Louisiana Supreme Court from November 1, 1868, to November 3, 1876.

Born in Greeneville, Tennessee, Wyly graduated from Jefferson College. He was elected a District Judge in 1868, but "resigned shortly thereafter to become Supreme Court Justice". Wyly "owned one of the largest Cotton Plantations in Louisiana", and ran unsuccessfully for the United States Senate in 1877.

Wyly died on the S.S. St. Louis en route from Liverpool to New York City.

References

1831 births
1903 deaths
People from Greeneville, Tennessee
Justices of the Louisiana Supreme Court
People who died at sea
19th-century American judges